Cuyahoga Valley Scenic Railroad is a Class III railroad operating diesel-electric and steam-powered excursion trips through Peninsula, Ohio in the Cuyahoga Valley, primarily through the scenic Cuyahoga Valley National Park.

History

Based on a track bed and rails originally laid down around 1880, right-of-way ownership transitioned over the years from Valley Railway to Cleveland Terminal & Valley Railroad (CT&V), to the Baltimore and Ohio Railroad, to the Chessie System. Currently, the National Park Service own the rails and right-of-way within Cuyahoga Valley National Park. CVSR co-operates with Wheeling and Lake Erie Railway (WLE) on operation of the railroad track south of CUVA to Canton. Cuyahoga Valley Scenic Railroad operates their excursion trains in co-operation with both the NPS & WLE.

The history of trains in the Cuyahoga Valley stretches back more than 100 years. In 1880, the Valley Railway began operations, transporting coal to Cleveland, Akron, and Canton from the Tuscarawas River Valley and providing passenger service along the way. After a decade of operation, the Valley Railway became part of the Baltimore & Ohio Railroad. In the 20th century, competition from automobiles, trucks, and buses caused the decline of both freight and passenger service. Interest in the line was renewed in 1972 as a scenic excursion route and the Cuyahoga Valley Preservation and Scenic Railway Association was born.

Today
Originally known as the Cuyahoga Valley Line, the scenic railroad now operates as Cuyahoga Valley Scenic Railroad (CVSR).

From the current CVSR Rockside station, (other railroads') existing tracks follow the West Bank of the Cuyahoga River to along: Valley Belt Road, Bradley Road, Jennings Road, Steelyard Drive, Holmden Avenue, Quigley Road; Crossing over the Cuyahoga River on the railroad draw bridge near Quigley and West 3rd, then follow the east bank of the Cuyahoga River to Canal Road near Commercial Road, ending up along Canal Road between Ontario Avenue and West 2nd Street.

Future
Several Ohio and Erie Canal-oriented organizations in Cleveland, Cuyahoga County and Summit County are pushing for extension of CVSR operations farther North along the Canal corridor into Cleveland. Some other organizations have been researching the feasibility of commuter rail operations between Akron-Canton and Cleveland.

One of the big issues to be resolved would be scheduling and controlling access since the tracks through Cleveland and Newburgh Heights are used by freight train traffic, and much of the route above is single track with limited sidings.

Accidents

The CVSR has had a few accidents in recent history including most recently hitting a car at a crossing. A person died in 2004 after being hit by RS18U 1822 during a Polar Express excursion.

On June 18, 2009, an automobile collided with a weekday train at an ungated crossing with no warning lights. The driver of the car was not expecting the train as he thought it only ran at weekends.

On July 13, 2012, a southbound CVSR train struck an eastbound car at the Portage St. crossing in northern Stark County. The elderly female driver was killed.

On November 1, 2015 a pedestrian was killed by FPA-4 6780 when it was still numbered 800 in a collision in Peninsula, OH.

Schedule
CVSR's schedule varies with seasonal demands. Currently, CVSR operates on Saturdays in January–February, Saturdays and Sundays in March–April, Fridays-Sundays in May and Tuesdays-Sundays in June through October. In November, the scenic train runs on weekends only due to The Polar Express. One train makes daily round-trips from Independence to Akron, which takes about 3 hours (1½ hours one-way).

Operations
CVSR offers a variety of trips throughout the year.

National Park Scenic
National Park Scenic excursions allow passengers to ride throughout the entire route as well as get on and off at various stations along the way.

Steam in the Valley
Typically each year CVSR hosts visiting steam-powered equipment. Examples of such equipment include Ohio Central No. 1293, Viscose No. 6, and Nickel Plate Road No. 765.

The North Pole Adventure
Around mid-November and continuing through mid-December, the CVSR provides special holiday themed excursions. These excursions are only offered out of Rockside station and Akron Northside station. Children (and even adults) are encouraged to ride in their pajamas. Elves greet passengers at the door and help them find their seats. While underway, the children write letters to Santa, get served hot chocolate and cookies, play games, and sing Christmas songs. Both trains eventually end up at the "North Pole". On the return trip, each child gets a surprise visit from a very important jolly fellow.

Explorer
For $5 a bicyclist may ride the train one way from any one of CVSR's nine stations. The bike is loaded onto a re-purposed baggage car and bikers are seated in a car directly following it. Similar programs are in place for hikers, runners and passengers with kayaks for a slightly different price. The Explorer program (previously known as Bike Aboard) is only offered from May through October.

Train to Canton
In summer 2003, CVSR began service between Akron and Canton. CVSR provided service between Akron Northside Station and Canton Lincoln Highway Station until 2013. Canton service ended due to lack of ridership and poor track conditions.

Stations

Equipment

Locomotives

Former Locomotives

Cars

Management
 the railroad's management consists of:
Joe Mazur, President/CEO
Bobby Dinkins, Chief Operating Officer
Greg Domzalski, Director of Finance
Carl Bennett III, Director of Operations
Kelly Koehler, Director of Events
Katelyn Gainer, Director of Marketing and Communications
Lisa Brown, Director of Development

See also
 ABC Railway
 ALCO RSD-5
 Heritage railway
 Cleveland railroad history
 List of crossings of the Cuyahoga River
 List of heritage railroads in the United States
 List of Ohio railroads
 List of Ohio train stations
 Ohio and Erie Canal

Notes

Where "-Longitude" is the degrees in decimal with the "W" suffix replaced by a "-" prefix"Latitude" is the degrees in decimal without the "N" suffix.

References

General references

External links
Cuyahoga Valley Scenic Railroad

Cuyahoga Valley Scenic Railroad
Transportation in Cuyahoga County, Ohio
Transportation in Summit County, Ohio
Tourist attractions in Cuyahoga County, Ohio
Tourist attractions in Summit County, Ohio
Railway companies established in 1972